DWPS (91.1 FM) is a radio station owned and operated by Our Lady's Foundation. Its studios and transmitter are located at Zulueta St., Gubat, Sorsogon.

References

External links
DWPS FB Page

Radio stations in Sorsogon